"Johnny the Rucker", also spelled Johnny the Rocker, is a song written by Swedish pop and rock artist Magnus Uggla and performed by him at the Swedish Melodifestivalen 1979. It was produced by Anders Henriksson and Uggla.

The song finished tenth and last, with 22 points. The song is on the track listing for the EP Magnus Uggla Band sjunger schlagers.

On the Swedish Singles Chart, it peaked at number four.

Charts

References

External links

1979 singles
Magnus Uggla songs
Melodifestivalen songs of 1979
Songs written by Magnus Uggla
CBS Records singles
1979 songs